Count Władysław Grzegorz Branicki (25 February 1783 in Warsaw – 27 August 1843 in Warsaw) was a Polish nobleman, senator and general in the Russian military. He was a putative grandson of Catherine the Great, through his maternal line.

He was owner of the immense Biała Cerkiew estates. After an army career where he was much decorated, he became a senator and political adviser in Russia.

Marriage and issue
In 1813 Władysław Grzegorz married Countess Róża Potocka, officially the daughter of Stanisław Szczęsny Potocki and the artist, Józefina Amalia Mniszech. They had seven children:
 
 Franciszek Ksawery Branicki (1816–1879), married to Countess Pelagia Zamoyska Rembielińska
 Eliza Branicka (1820–1876), married first, Count Zygmunt Krasiński then his brother, Ludwik Krasiński
 Aleksander Branicki (1821–1877), married Anna Ninna Hołyńska Klamry coat of arms
 Zofia Katarzyna Branicka (1821 or 1824–1886), married Prince Livio Erba-Odescalchi (1805–1885)
 Konstanty Grzegorz Branicki (1824–1884), married Countess Jadwiga Potocka
 Katarzyna Branicka (1825–1907), married Count Adam Józef Potocki
 Władysław Michał Branicki (1826–1884), inherited Biała Cerkiew (due to his eldest brother's forced exile), married Princess Maria Aniela Sapieha

Honours and awards
 Order of the White Eagle
 Order of St. Anna, 1st class
 Order of St. Vladimir, 3rd class
 Order of Saint George, 4th class
 Order of St. John of Jerusalem (Russia)
 Pour le Mérite (Prussia)
 Order of the Red Eagle (Prussia)
 Kulm Cross
 Gold Sword for Bravery 
 Order of Leopold (Austria) 
 Military Order of Max Joseph (Bavaria) 
 Iron Cross of 1813 (Prussia)
 Order of Military Merit, (Württemberg) 
 Order of Military Merit (France)

Bibliography
 Polski Słownik Biograficzny t. 2 s. 412
 Marek Ruszczyc, Dzieje rodu i fortuny Branickich, Warszawa 1991

References

1783 births
1843 deaths
Polish generals in the Imperial Russian Army
Wladyslaw Grzegorz
Recipients of the Order of St. Vladimir, 3rd class
Recipients of the Order of the White Eagle (Russia)
Recipients of the Order of St. Anna, 1st class
Recipients of the Pour le Mérite (civil class)
Recipients of the Gold Sword for Bravery
Recipients of the Military Order of Max Joseph
Recipients of the Order of Military Merit (France)
Recipients of the Iron Cross (1813)
Knights Hospitaller
Russian military personnel of the Napoleonic Wars
19th-century Polish landowners